There are many small communities called Ship Cove; most are in Newfoundland.

 Ship Cove may refer to Botwood, Newfoundland and Labrador
 Ship Cove, a very small Cape Shore farming community on the southwestern Avalon Peninsula
 Ship Cove on Bell Island
 Ship Cove on the Great Northern Peninsula near Cape Onion
 Ship Cove, New Zealand in the Marlborough Sounds of New Zealand